Isador Cortez, primarily known under the alias of Machete, is a fictional character in the Spy Kids films, the Grindhouse fake trailer, and the Machete films. The character is played by Danny Trejo.

History
According to Spy Kids and Machete director Robert Rodriguez, the character Machete was always intended for Danny Trejo: "When I met Danny, I said, 'This guy should be like the Mexican Jean-Claude Van Damme or Charles Bronson, putting out a movie every year and his name should be Machete'". Rodriguez also said, in an interview, that he "wrote [Trejo] this idea of a federale from Mexico who gets hired to do hatchet jobs in the U.S. I had heard sometimes FBI or DEA have a really tough job that they don't want to get their own agents killed on, they'll hire an agent from Mexico to come do the job for $25,000. I thought, 'That's Machete. He would come and do a really dangerous job for a lot of money to him, but for everyone else over here, it's peanuts'. But I never got around to making it".

Character
Isador Cortez is a former Mexican Federale and mercenary. His weapon of choice is the machete, but he is also very proficient with firearms. Cortez is fluent in both Spanish and English. On his chest is a tattoo depicting a woman. Trejo has described Machete as a "badass", and said that his mother had started calling him "Machete".

In Spy Kids, he has his own shop that sells spy gadgets, and is the uncle of Juni Cortez and Carmen Cortez, their father's brother.

Character biography

Spy Kids
In Spy Kids, Machete is first seen in a flashback, at his brother Gregorio's wedding. When Gregorio and his wife Ingrid get captured by Fegan Floop, Carmen and Juni, Gregorio's children, visit their "Uncle Machete", hoping he will help them to save their parents. Machete refuses to go after Gregorio, as they are estranged, but allows his niece and nephew to stay with him, and shows them a one-passenger jet that could get them to Floop's castle. Carmen and Juni take the jet, some of his gadgets, and a map of the castle at night. Machete appears again near the end of the film, when he decides to help the Cortezes against an army of robotic children. When asked why he came back, Machete claimed it is the same reason he left. Gregorio no longer remembers the reason and neither does Machete. Machete then cries in his brother's arms. At the end of the film, he is seen with the Cortez family.

Spy Kids 2: The Island of Lost Dreams
In Spy Kids 2: The Island of Lost Dreams, Machete has built Carmen and Juni a high-tech treehouse after they have become secret agents. Machete then shows some of his latest gadgets - spy watches and the Machete elastic wonder. At the end of the film, Carmen claims she cannot sing, so Machete shows Carmen a microphone that autotunes her voice and Juni a guitar that plays itself. When they are done, Machete informs Carmen and Juni that he did not put any batteries in them and that Carmen was actually singing and Juni was actually playing guitar.

Spy Kids 3-D: Game Over
Machete appears near the end of Spy Kids 3-D: Game Over, when he helps battle the Toymaker's video-game robots. After the battle, Machete becomes closer with the Cortezes.

Machete
In Machete, Isador "Machete" Cortez witnesses his wife and daughter being murdered by ruthless drug baron Rogelio Torrez (Steven Seagal). Three years later, he is seen working at a construction site in Texas. There, he is paid $150,000 by businessman Michael Booth (Jeff Fahey) to assassinate the anti-illegal immigration politician John McLaughlin (Robert De Niro). After getting shot in the neck before he can shoot McLaughlin, Machete realizes that he has been set up in a false-flag operation. Booth is revealed to be working with Torrez, a staunch supporter of McLaughlin's. Seeking vengeance, Machete kidnaps Booth's daughter and wife with the help of a few allies, and also takes down his henchmen. This eventually leads to a confrontation between Machete and his allies (mostly Mexican immigrants) and Torrez and his gang. Machete triumphs, leaving the criminals for dead.

Spy Kids: All the Time in the World
Machete makes a cameo appearance in Spy Kids: All the Time in the World, where he is seen tripping in a laboratory when time is frozen by Danger D'Amo (Armageddon). In a deleted scene, while Cecil and Rebecca are running from two OSS agents, they end up in his laboratory, managing to ruin several experiments. As they are found by Machete, he hides them from the OSS agents.

Machete Kills
Machete returns in Machete Kills, where he is employed by Rathcock (Charlie Sheen), the President of the United States, to foil a plan of world domination. The perpetrator is initially thought to be Mendez (Demián Bichir), a crazed revolutionary planning to missile-bomb the Congressional Palace. However, Machete finds out that the true mastermind is Luther Voz (Mel Gibson), who is keen on initiating rampage throughout the U.S. Machete finds Voz and foils his plans, but a now-disfigured Voz, having been burnt by Machete, escapes into outer space with his henchmen. Without hesitating, Machete agrees to track him down in space. The end of the film advertises a third Machete-led spin-off film entitled Machete Kills Again in Space.

Spy Kids: Mission Critical
Machete makes a brief cameo in an episode of Spy Kids: Mission Critical, where he is once again seen in a laboratory tinkering with gadgets.

Reception
Sharon Knolle of Moviefone called Machete the Mexican equivalent of fictional British spy James Bond.

In popular culture
In February 2015, Snickers' Super Bowl XLIX commercial featured a parody of a scene from an episode of The Brady Bunch entitled "The Subject Was Noses". In the commercial, Carol and Mike try to calm down a very angry Machete. When the parents give Machete a Snickers bar, he reverts into Marcia before an irate Jan (played by Steve Buscemi) rants upstairs and walks away. In a second commercial set earlier, Marcia (as Machete) angrily brushes her hair while yelling through her door.

Appearances
 Spy Kids (2001)
 Spy Kids 2: The Island of Lost Dreams (2002)
 Spy Kids 3-D: Game Over (2003)
 Grindhouse (2007) (fake trailer)
 Machete (2010)
 Spy Kids: All the Time in the World (2011)
 Machete Kills (2013)
 Snickers: The Brady Bunch (2015)
 Spy Kids: Mission Critical (2018) (silent)

Canonicity
Trejo and Rodriguez made two different statements regarding the Machete films' relation to the Spy Kids movies. Trejo jokingly stated that it's "what Uncle Machete does when he's not taking care of the kids", while Rodriguez said in a Reddit AMA that they are alternate universes.

Notes

References

External links

 Machete on IMDb

Fictional assassins
Fictional American secret agents
Film characters introduced in 2001
Action film characters
Fictional mass murderers
Fictional mercenaries
Fictional Mexican people
Fictional swordfighters
Fictional vigilantes
Grindhouse (film)
Spy Kids characters